Patrick Möschl (born 6 March 1993) is an Austrian professional footballer who plays as a midfielder for VfB Oldenburg.

Career
In June 2017, Möschl left SV Ried in his native Austria for German 2. Bundesliga side Dynamo Dresden, signing a two-year contract until 2019.

He moved to Regionalliga Nord club VfB Oldenburg as a free agent on 31 January 2022, the last day of the 2022 winter transfer window.

Career statistics

References

External links
 

Living people
1993 births
People from Saalfelden
Footballers from Salzburg (state)
Austrian footballers
Association football midfielders
Austrian Football Bundesliga players
2. Bundesliga players
3. Liga players
SV Ried players
Dynamo Dresden players
1. FC Magdeburg players
VfB Oldenburg players
Austrian expatriate footballers
Austrian expatriate sportspeople in Germany
Expatriate footballers in Germany